Vrams Gunnarstorp Castle is a 17th-century castle located in Bjuv Municipality in Skåne County,  Sweden. The estate is located in Norra Vrams parish on the south side of Söderåsen in northwestern  Skåne.

History
It was originally built by Danish nobleman Jørgen Vind (1593-1644), who had the  castle constructed starting during 1633.  In 1838, it came into possession of  Rudolf Tornérhjelm (1814-1885) who was a member of the Swedish Parliament. It was exchanged by the members of the Berch family in exchange for Össjö Castle and 17 barrels of gold. Current appearance of the castle dates to the mid 1800s.  Vrams Gunnarstorp underwent a thorough restoration in the 1850s under the direction of the Danish architect Michael Gottlieb Bindesbøll (1800–1856).

See also
List of castles in Sweden

References

External links
Vrams Gunnarstorp website

Castles in Skåne County